Italica was  an ancient Italic settlement

Italica may also refer to:
Italica Press, American publisher
Italica Group, a cultivar group of cabbage family
Air Italica, defunct Italian airline

See also
; includes a long list of plant subspecies and varieties dubbed something italica